Valentine Richard Quin, 1st Earl of Dunraven and Mount-Earl, 1st Baronet (30 July 1752 – 24 August 1824) was an Irish Peer and MP.

He was the son of Windham Quin and Frances Dawson. The Quins were an old Irish family who had long been associated with Adare. The Earl's grandfather had added to the family's wealth and estates by marriage to the heiress Mary Widenham of Kildimo.

He was created a Baronet in 1781. He was elected in 1799 as Member of Parliament for his father's old seat Killmallock to the Irish House of Commons, sitting until the union of Ireland and Great Britain in 1800/01.

He was created Baron Adare on 31 July 1800 – as a staunch supporter of the political union, he was recommended by Lord Cornwallis  – Viscount Mount-Earl on 3 February 1816, and Earl of Dunraven and Mount-Earl on 5 February 1822, all titles in the Peerage of Ireland. He presumably chose the title of Dunraven in honour of his daughter-in-law, the heiress Caroline Wyndham of Dunraven Castle, who had married his eldest son in 1810. His earldom lasted only two years until his death in 1824, when his son, Windham Henry Quin, became the 2nd Earl of Dunraven and Mount-Earl. The family name had officially become Wyndham-Quin in 1815.

Marriage and children
He married firstly Lady Frances Muriel Fox-Strangways, daughter of Stephen Fox-Strangways, 1st Earl of Ilchester, and his wife, the former Elizabeth Horner, on 24 August 1777. They had the following children:
Lady Harriet Quin (d. 13 December 1845), married Sir William Payne-Gallwey, 1st Baronet
Windham Henry Quin, 2nd Earl of Dunraven (1782–1850)

He married secondly Margaret Mary Coghlan in 1816.

He is buried at St. Nicholas' Church of Ireland in Adare, County Limerick, Ireland.

References

External links

|-

|-

1752 births
1824 deaths
Alumni of Magdalen College, Oxford
Irish MPs 1798–1800
Members of the Parliament of Ireland (pre-1801) for County Limerick constituencies
Peers of Ireland created by George III
Earls of Dunraven and Mount-Earl